Karl Burman sen. ( – 10 May 1965) was an Estonian architect and painter.

Burman was born in Sumy, Russian empire. His younger brother was artist Paul Burman. In 1900 he attended the Stroganov Art School in Moscow, and then between 1901 and 1902 he attended the Stieglitz Art School in St. Petersburg (now Saint Petersburg Art and Industry Academy). Then he studied architecture at the St. Petersburg Academy of Arts throughout 1902–1909.  He died in Tallinn, Estonia.

Romantik Burman  was an exhibition celebrating his work at the Museum of Estonian Architecture between 19 June—7 September 2003.

References

1882 births
1965 deaths
People from Sumy
People from Sumsky Uyezd
Baltic-German people
Art Nouveau architects
Estonian architects
Soviet architects
Stroganov Moscow State Academy of Arts and Industry alumni
Burials at Metsakalmistu